Birthana consocia is a moth in the family Immidae. It was described by Francis Walker in 1865. It is found on the Moluccas.

Adults are blackish brown, the forewings with a broad luteous (muddy-yellow) band extending from much beyond half the length of the costa to the end of the interior border.

References

Moths described in 1865
Immidae
Moths of Oceania